is a book by Yukio Mishima. It is an autobiographical essay, a memoir of the author's relationship to his body. The book recounts the author's experiences with, and reflections upon, his bodybuilding and martial arts training.

The book was first published in 1968, gathering what had appeared in the Takeshi Maramatsu-founded magazine Criticism from late 1965 on. It was translated into English by John Bester (Tokyo: Kodansha International, 1970, ; New York City, Grove Press, 1970, ; London, Secker and Warburg, 1971, ; Kodansha America reissue edition, 1994, ; Kodansha International, 2003). In 1972, the American fiction writer Hortense Calisher billed the book as "a classic of self-revelation" and Mishima as "a mind of the utmost subtlety, broadly educated". Calisher wrote, "To paraphrase him in words not his, [...] is to try to build a china pagoda with a peck of nails. [...] only the frivolous will not empathize with what is going on here; this is a being for whom life--and death too--must be exigeant."

References

External links
Sun and Steel at The Yukio Mishima Web Page. 
Review of Sun and Steel by Seigo Nakao

1968 books
Essays by Yukio Mishima
Literary autobiographies
Works originally published in literary magazines
1968 essays
Secker & Warburg books
Essays about literature